V. Narahari Rao was an Indian civil servant who served the Indian Audit and Accounts Service in the post-independence India. He served as the first Comptroller and Auditor General of India from 1948 to 1954. The Government of India awarded him the third highest civilian honour of the Padma Bhushan, in 1954, for his contributions to civil service.

See also 
 Comptroller and Auditor General of India

References 

Recipients of the Padma Bhushan in civil service
Year of birth missing
Year of death missing
Indian civil servants
Comptrollers in India